Lieutenant General Iftikhar Ali Khan, HI(M) SBt (5 January 1941 – 22 August 2009) was a three-star rank army general of the Pakistan Army. He was the former Secretary of Defense and a Chief of General Staff (CGS) of the Pakistan Army.

Early life
Khan was born in a family of Jodhra and Alpial tribes of Rajput on 5 January 1941 to Brigadier (retired) Fateh Khan in Chakri village, Rawalpindi District.

Personal life 
He was the older brother of Chaudhary Nisar Ali Khan.

Military career
Iftikhar Ali Khan was commissioned in the Pakistan Army in October 1961 in the 26th PMA Long Course. Khan served as the Chief Instructor of the Armed Forces War College at National Defence College, Rawalpindi from April 1991 to May 1993. He was promoted to Lieutenant General in May 1993 and did a brief stint as Commandant at the National Defence College, Rawalpindi until June 1993. He was later appointed  Commander XXXI Corps, Bahawalpur, a post he held for two and a half years.

Death
He died on 22 August 2009 from a heart attack. He was buried on 23 August 2009 in his ancestral graveyard in Chakri and his funeral prayers were attended by politicians, senior army officials, and religious scholars.

References

 

Pakistani generals
Defence Secretaries of Pakistan
2009 deaths
1941 births
Baloch Regiment officers